Shandong East Circuit or Shandong East Province was one of the major circuits during the Jin dynasty. Before Jin invaded the area, it was administered as Jingdong East Circuit under the Song dynasty.

References
 

Circuits of the Jin dynasty (1115–1234)
Former circuits in Shandong
Former circuits in Jiangsu